Sir William John Alexander, 3rd Baronet QC (1 April 1797 – 31 March 1873) was a British lawyer.

He was the elder son of Sir Robert Alexander, 2nd Baronet and his wife Elisa Wallis, daughter of John Wallis. In 1859, he succeeded his father as baronet. Alexander was educated at Trinity College Dublin and then at Trinity College, Cambridge, where he graduated Bachelor of Arts and later proceeded Master of Arts.

Alexander was nominated a Queen's Counsel in 1844 and became a bencher of the Middle Temple in the same year. He was called to the bar by Lincoln's Inn in 1825. In 1863, he was appointed Attorney-General of the Duchy of Cornwall by Albert Edward, Prince of Wales, an office he held until his death in 1873.

Alexander died unmarried and was succeeded in the baronetcy by his younger brother John.

References

1797 births
1873 deaths
Alumni of Trinity College, Cambridge
Baronets in the Baronetage of the United Kingdom
Members of Lincoln's Inn
Members of the Middle Temple
19th-century King's Counsel
William